The Vanadzor Football Academy, is a modern football training school-academy located in Armenia's third largest city of Vanadzor, Lori Province. It is the 3rd-largest football academy in Armenia.

Overview
The construction of the academy was launched in early 2014 by the initiative of the Football Federation of Armenia and the assistance of the UEFA. On 29 October 2016, the complex was officially opened by the FFA president Ruben Hayrapetyan and the governor of Lori Province Artur Nalbandyan. The opening ceremony was attended by the President of Armenia Serzh Sargsyan. 

Occupying an area of 44,000 m², the complex is home to:
3 natural-grass regular-sized football training pitches.
1 artificial turf regular-sized football training pitch with a seating capacity of 1,000.
Three-story service building with a total area of 1,260 m², housing a fitness centre and spa, physiotherapy rooms, medical services, conference room, etc.

The academy is able to serve up to 600 trainees. All of the training pitches meet the professional standards set by FIFA and UEFA. Currently, around 350 young trainees are served by the academy.

The total cost of the construction was AMD 1,133,000,000 (approximately US$ 2,385,000). Around 87% of the total cost was paid by the FFA, while the rest was paid by the UEFA.

References

External links
Vanadzor Football Academy at the official website of the Football Federation of Armenia
Photos of the Vanadzor football academy at armsport.am

Football academies in Armenia
Football in Armenia
Association football training grounds in Armenia
2016 establishments in Armenia
Sports venues completed in 2016
Lori FC